Ortholexis hollandi, commonly known as Holland's scarce sprite, is a species of butterfly in the family Hesperiidae. It is found in Liberia, Ivory Coast, Ghana, Nigeria, Cameroon, Angola, the Democratic Republic of the Congo and Zambia. The habitat consists of wetter forests.

The larvae feed on Strophanthus sarmentosus.

References

Seitz, A. Die Gross-Schmetterlinge der Erde 13: Die Afrikanischen Tagfalter. Plate XIII 80

Butterflies described in 1909
Hesperiidae